The 2013–14 Svenska Cupen was the 58th season of Svenska Cupen and the second season with the current format. The winners of the competition earned a place in the second qualifying round of the 2014–15 UEFA Europa League. If they had already qualified for European competition, the qualification spot would have gone to another team, determined by a number of factors.

A total of 96 clubs entered the competition. The first round commenced on 21 May 2013 and the final was played on 18 May 2014 at Friends Arena in Solna. IFK Göteborg were the defending champions, having beaten Djurgårdens IF 3–1 on penalties after the match had finished 1–1 after extra time in last season's final. They were knocked out by Superettan newcomers IK Sirius in the quarter-finals.

IF Elfsborg won their third Svenska Cupen title on 18 May 2014 after defeating Helsingborgs IF 1–0.

European competition qualification 
The winners of the 2013–14 Svenska Cupen will earn a place in the second qualifying round of the 2014–15 UEFA Europa League. The qualification spot will be awarded to the runner-up in the competition if the winner is already qualified to the 2014–15 UEFA Champions League by winning the 2013 Allsvenskan. In this case the runner-up will go into the Europa League in the first qualifying round and the third placed team in Allsvenskan will go into the second qualifying round instead of the first qualifying round. If the winner or runner-up (in the previous mentioned situation) is already qualified for the first qualifying round of the Europa League by finishing as the third placed team in Allsvenskan, they will go into the second qualifying round and the fourth placed team in Allsvenskan will be awarded a qualifying spot for the first qualifying round.

Teams

Qualifying rounds 

The only three associations of the Swedish District Football Associations that had a qualifying tournament were Dalarnas FF, Hälsinglands FF and Örebro Läns FF, the other districts decided their teams by Distriktsmästerskap (District Championships) or by club ranking 2012.

Round 1
64 teams from the third tier and below of the Swedish league system competed in this round. The round started on 21 May 2013 and finished on 4 August. The number in brackets indicates what tier of Swedish football each team competed in during the 2013 season. Bunkeflo FF was the lowest-ranked team in this round, competing in Division 5, the seventh tier of Swedish football.

Round 2
All teams from the 2013 Allsvenskan and the 2013 Superettan entered in this round, 32 teams in total, where they were joined by the 32 winners from round 1. The 32 teams from Allsvenskan and Superettan were seeded and played against the 32 winners from round 1, the matches were played at the home venues for the unseeded teams. Ullareds IK was the lowest-ranked team in this round, competing in Division 4, the sixth tier of Swedish football.

Group stage
The 32 winners from round 2 were divided into eight groups of four teams. The 16 highest ranked winners from the previous rounds were seeded to the top two positions in each groups and the 16 remaining winners were unseeded in the draw. The ranking of the 16 seeded teams was decided by league position in the 2013 season. All teams in the group played each other once, the highest ranked teams from the previous rounds and lower tier teams had the right to play two home matches. The draw for the group stage was held on 13 November 2013. The group stage was played in March 2014. Carlstad United BK, Hudiksvalls FF, Rynninge IK, Sandvikens IF and Torslanda IK were the lowest-ranked teams in this round, all competing in Division 2, the fourth tier of Swedish football.

Tie-breaking criteria and key
If two or more teams were equal on points on completion of the group matches, the following criteria were applied to determine the rankings
superior goal difference
higher number of goals scored
result between the teams in question
higher league position in the 2013 season

Group 1

Group 2

Group 3

Group 4

Group 5

Group 6

Group 7

Group 8

Knockout stage

Qualified teams

Bracket

Quarter-finals
The quarter-finals were played on 22 and 23 March 2014 and consisted of the eight teams that won their respective group in the previous round. The four best group winners were seeded and drawn against the remaining four group winners, with the seeded teams entitled to play the match at their home venue. The draw for the quarter-finals was held on 17 March 2014. GAIS and IK Sirius were the lowest-ranked teams in this round, both competing in Superettan, the second tier of Swedish football.

Semi-finals
The semi-finals were played on 1 May 2014 and was contested by the four winners from the quarter-finals. The teams drawn first played home. The draw for the semi-finals took place on 25 March 2014. IK Sirius was the lowest-ranked team in this round, competing in Superettan, the second tier of Swedish football.

Final

The final was played on 18 May 2014 at Friends Arena, Solna. The home team was designated through a draw.

References

External links
 Official site 
 2013–14 Svenska Cupen at Soccerway

Svenska Cupen seasons
Cupen
Cupen
Sweden